Macrophage-stimulating protein receptor is a protein that in humans is encoded by the MST1R gene. MST1R is also known as RON (Recepteur d'Origine Nantais) kinase, named after the French city in which it was discovered. It is related to the c-MET receptor tyrosine kinase.

Interactions 

MST1R has been shown to interact with Grb2.

References

Further reading 

Tyrosine kinase receptors